Otter Creek is a creek located in the Atlin Country region of British Columbia.  This creek flows into the south side of Lake Surprise about 2 miles west of Wright Creek.  Otter Creek was discovered in 1898.  The creek has been mined and for some years Compagnie Francaise des Mines d'Or du Canada hydraulicked a number of leases along Otter Creek.

References

External links
 

Rivers of British Columbia
Atlin District